The 2019 European Parliament election in Ireland is the Irish component of the 2019 European Parliament election and was held on Friday, 24 May 2019, on the same day as the 2019 local elections and a referendum easing restrictions on divorce. The election was conducted in three constituencies under the single transferable vote (STV). Thirteen MEPs were elected, but the last candidate elected in both Dublin and South did not take their seats until after Brexit on 31 January 2020.

Constituency changes

The United Kingdom invoked Article 50 to withdraw from the European Union on 29 March 2017 following the 2016 referendum to leave the European Union. As Article 50 has a two-year period for withdrawal, the United Kingdom would not be part of the 2019 European Parliament election scheduled for May 2019. In July 2018, the European Council made a decision to redistribute a number of the seats from the United Kingdom to other member states. The allocation of MEPs from Ireland increased from 11 to 13; however, this change would not take effect until the United Kingdom has left the EU, which took place on 31 January 2020. As the United Kingdom was still a member of the EU at the beginning of the 2019–2024 parliamentary term, the allocation of seats will remain as it was in the previous parliament, until its withdrawal becomes legally effective.

A Constituency Commission chaired by High Court judge Robert Haughton was established by the Minister for Housing, Planning and Local Government in July 2018 to redraw constituencies in line with the change in seats. The commission's report was published on 24 September 2018 and proposed the following changes:
Dublin gains an extra seat from 3 to 4; with no boundary changes. Full electorate is 884,118, giving electorate of 221,029.5 per seat.
South gains an extra seat from 4 to 5, and gains counties Laois and Offaly from Midlands–North-West. Full electorate is 1,417,017, giving electorate of 283,403.4 per seat.
Midlands–North-West loses Laois and Offaly to South, but remains a 4 seater. Full electorate is 1,224,888, giving electorate of 306,222 per seat.

The European Parliament Elections (Amendment) Act 2019 enacted the changes recommended by the Constituency Commission.

It also provided for the situation that Ireland's representation remained at 11 with an amendment to the rules, "For the purpose of the European elections held in the year 2019, the return made by the chief returning officer […] shall declare that the last candidate deemed to be elected […] in each of the constituencies of Dublin and South as specified in the Third Schedule, shall not take up their seats in the European Parliament until such time as a date has been specified by the Parliament for the taking up of such seats".

Taoiseach Leo Varadkar had incorrectly suggested that the votes would be counted twice in the constituencies which had an increased number of seats, to account for either contingency. However, Minister for Housing, Planning and Local Government Eoghan Murphy later clarified that there would be only one count for each constituency, and that the final candidate to be deemed elected in Dublin and South would not take their seats until the withdrawal of the United Kingdom.

Retiring incumbents
The following MEPs did not seek re-election:

Candidates
Nominations closed at midday on 15 April 2019, with 59 candidates in total: 19 in Dublin (4 seats), 17 in Midlands–North-West (4 seats) and 23 in South (5 seats).

European alliances

Independents 4 Change was not affiliated to a parliamentary group at the time of the election, but joined European United Left–Nordic Green Left group.

Results

MEPs elected

Opinion polls

Party opinion polling

Nationwide

Dublin

Midlands-North-West

South

Candidate polling

Dublin

Midlands-North-West

South

See also
2020 Irish general election

Footnotes

References

External links
 EU Elections 2019 RTÉ News

2019 in Irish politics
2019 elections in the Republic of Ireland
Ireland
European Parliament elections in the Republic of Ireland